The III Grand Prix de Rouen-les-Essarts was a combined Formula One and Formula Two motor race held on 28 June 1953 at the Rouen-Les-Essarts circuit. The race was held over 60 laps and was won from pole position by Giuseppe Farina in a Ferrari 625. Teammate Mike Hawthorn was second and set fastest lap, and Philippe Étancelin was third in a Talbot-Lago T26C, the highest Formula One finisher.

Classification 

Formula One competitors highlighted in blue.

References

Rouen Grand Prix
Rouen Grand Prix
Rouen Grand Prix
Rouen Grand Prix